Kenneth Gene Stephens (born April 2, 1931) is a former American football coach. He served as head coach the University of Central Arkansas from 1972 to 1981 Lamar University from 1982 to 1985, and Arkansas Tech University from 1986 to 1992, compiling a career college football coaching record of 106–106–8.

Stephens is a graduate of Central Arkansas, where he played as a defensive back and still holds the record for interceptions in a game with five. He began his coaching career at the high school level, winning three state championships at North Little Rock, Arkansas, before moving on the Arkansas State University and the University of Arkansas as an assistant. He was appointed head coach at his alma mater in 1972. In 10 seasons, Stephens built a 67–35–6 record at Central Arkansas, third-best in school history only to his two successors, winning four Arkansas Intercollegiate Conference titles and taking the Bears to four NAIA playoffs, the first in school history.

In 1982, Stephens went on to coach at Lamar University in Beaumont, Texas, but resigned in 1985 after four consecutive losing seasons. He then became head coach at Arkansas Tech, spending seven seasons there before retiring in 1992. Stephens returned to coaching in 2001, taking over as head coach at Ranger College in Ranger, Texas, for four seasons.

On February 28, 2014, Stephens was inducted into the Arkansas Sports Hall of Fame.

Head coaching record

College football

References

1931 births
Living people
American football defensive backs
Arkansas Razorbacks football coaches
Arkansas State Red Wolves football coaches
Arkansas Tech Wonder Boys football coaches
Central Arkansas Bears football coaches
Lamar Cardinals football coaches
Ranger Rangers football coaches
College golf coaches in  the United States
College men's track and field athletes in the United States
High school football coaches in Arkansas
High school football coaches in Oklahoma
People from Conway, Arkansas
Players of American football from Arkansas